Tourism Development Bank Ltd was a national level development bank in Nepal with its corporate office located in Kathmandu. The bank was established in 2009 and offered a wide range of financial products and services. It had a paid up capital of NPR 780 million and had 15 branches. The bank was also a member of society for worldwide international financial telecommunications SWIFT.

Expansion 
Tourism Development Bank completed acquisition of Kalinchowk Development Bank & Matribhumi Bikas Bank and started joint operation from 8 January 2017. After the acquisition and further expansion of its business and capital, paid up capital of the bank reached Rs 2002.7 million. The deposit base reached Rs 13100 million, and the bank floated loans worth Rs 12000 million. The development bank provided services to more than 100000 customers all over the country from 36 branches, 5 extension counter, and 19 ATM centers.

See also 

List of banks in Nepal

References

External links 
Official Website of Tourism Development Bank Limited
Official Website of Nepal Stock Exchange

Banks of Nepal
Tourism in Nepal
2009 establishments in Nepal